Batillaria is a genus of small salt marsh or mudflat snails, marine gastropod mollusks in the family Batillariidae, the horn snails.

Species
Species within the genus Batillaria include:
 Batillaria attramentaria (G. B. Sowerby I, 1855) - Japanese false cerith
 Batillaria australis (Quoy & Gaimard, 1834)
 Batillaria bornii (Sowerby II, 1887 in 1842-87)
 Batillaria estuarina (Tate, 1893)
 Batillaria flectosiphonata Ozawa, 1996
 Batillaria multiformis (Lischke, 1869)
 Batillaria mutata (Pilsbry & Vanatta, 1902)
 Batillaria sordida Gmelin, 1791
 Batillaria zonalis (Bruguière, 1792) - Japanese false cerith, synonyms: Batillaria aterrima, Batillaria atramenfaria, Batillaria cumingi and also (cotroversely with above) Batillaria multiformis

Synonyms:
 Batillaria minima (Gmelin, 1791) - West Indian false cerith, is a synonym of Lampanella minima (Gmelin, 1791)

References

 Ozawa, T., Köhler, F., Reid, D.G. & Glaubrecht, M. (2009). Tethyan relicts on continental coastlines of the northwestern Pacific Ocean and Australasia: molecular phylogeny and fossil record of batillariid gastropods (Caenogastropoda, Cerithioidea). Zoologica Scripta, 38: 503-525

Further reading 
  Ozawa T., Köhler F., Reid D. G. & Glaubrecht M. (2009). "Tethyan relicts on continental coastlines of the northwestern Pacific Ocean and Australasia: molecular phylogeny and fossil record of batillariid gastropods (Caenogastropoda, Cerithioidea)". Zoologica Scripta 38(5): 503-525. .

External links 
 

Batillariidae
Taxonomy articles created by Polbot